Mõõlu is a settlement in Rõuge Parish, Võru County in southeastern Estonia.

References

External links 
Satellite map at Maplandia.com

Villages in Võru County